Dixon High School (DHS) is a high school located on Lincoln Statue Drive and Peoria Avenue on the northern side of Dixon, Illinois.

Notable alumni
Charles Rudolph Walgreen (c. 1889), founder of Walgreens
Louella Parsons (1901), first Hollywood gossip columnist
Douglas MacLean (c. 1906), silent film actor, producer, and writer
Ronald Reagan (1928), 40th President of the United States
 Lou Bevil (1939), former MLB player (Washington Senators)
 Rondi Reed (1970), Tony Award-winning actress
Rita Crundwell (1971), criminal convicted of the largest municipal embezzlement in U.S. history
Isaiah Roby (2016), basketball player for NBA's OKC Thunder

References

External links
Dixon Public School District 170 Website

Public high schools in Illinois
Dixon, Illinois
Schools in Lee County, Illinois
1929 establishments in Illinois
Educational institutions established in 1929